Pavle "Paja" Jovanović (16 June 1859 – 30 November 1957) was a Serbian realist painter who painted more than 1,100 works including: The Wounded Montenegrin (1882), Decorating of the Bride (1886), The Takovo Uprising (1894), Migration of the Serbs (1896) and The Proclamation of Dušan's Law Codex (1900). As one of the best European painters of oriental scenes, Paja at the end of the 19th century turned to painting historical events of Serbian history. Paja was also the premier portraitist of Europe after 1905. He painted the Emperor Franz Joseph I of Austria 15 times, he painted royalty, major industrialists, scientists, bankers, oil barons and monopolists, including certain heirs to the Standard Oil fortune in the United States of America. He was a very sought-after portraitist world-wide, which made him incredibly wealthy in his lifetime.  Many European and international museums carry his works, signed under various names including: Paul Joanowitch in the National Gallery of Victoria and also two portraits in the Utah Museum of Fine Arts, Paul Joanowits, Paul Ivanovitch, Paul Joanovitch, Paul Joanovitsch, P. Joanowitsch and others.

Biography
 
Paja Jovanović was born in Vršac, Austrian Empire (modern-day Serbia). His father was photographer Stevan Jovanović and his mother was Ernestina née Deot, of French descent. He spent his childhood and early youth in this home town, where he saw the iconostasis of Pavel Đurković and Arsenije Teodorović in the town churches, which would influence his future works. 
So Paja Jovanović started drawing himself, at first in secret, copying church pictures and spending hours in the empty church that he considered his first teacher. However, at the time when the ecclesiastical municipality in Vršac decided to order new bells for the Cathedral and when it was necessary to create drawings of saints, it became known about his talent. Thus, already at the age of fourteen, Jovanović received his first commission, and, thanks to significant praise, a kind of pass to Vienna and the opportunity to enroll in the Academy.

Jovanović's mother died at a young age and his father went on to remarry. He received his first art lectures and knowledge from his teacher Vodecki. His father took him to Vienna in 1875 when he was 15, where he enrolled in the Academy of Fine Arts in 1877 in the class of professor Christian Griepenkerl. He finished the Academy in 1880, attending several important courses taught by Leopold Carl Müller, known as an "orientalist". There is no doubt that Miller's crucial lessons determined his painting preference. Noting the increased interest of Europe to the events in the Balkans, he travelled during the holidays to Albania, Montenegro, Dalmatia, Bosnia and Herzegovina, and Serbia gathering sketches and studies of the life of the Balkan peoples. Precisely these themes brought Paja Jovanović worldwide fame and popularity. In the following period, having noticed the greater interest of Europe for the Balkans, he painted mostly scenes from the life of the Serbs, Montenegrins, Herzogivinans, Aromanians and Albanians, which brought him a great reputation. Encouraged to visit the Balkan region during his hiatus, he studied the customs and folklore of the people, and in 1882 he was awarded the prize of the Academy and was given the Imperial scholarship for the composition The Wounded Montenegrin.

The public and many art critics directed their attention to the young painter, and in 1883 he signed a contract with the "French" gallery in London. He continued his travelling through Caucasus, Morocco, Egypt, Greece, Turkey, Italy, and Spain. A great number of sketches, notes, and studies, along with the collected objects from the life of the common people, will find their place in his famous genre-compositions, such as: Fencing, Decorating of the Bride, and Cockfighting. Some of Jovanović's most remarkable praises were gathered at two of his greatest exhibitions: Millennium exhibition in Budapest in 1896, where he prepared Migration of the Serbs for entry, but the Vršac triptych was sent instead, and the World Exhibition in Paris in 1900, for which he had painted a great historical composition The Proclamation of Dušan's Law Codex.

As of 1888, he was proclaimed a member of the Serbian Royal Academy. He was tasked with painting monumental, historical compositions. After 1905 he devoted himself exclusively to painting the portraits in the style of academic realism for the rich clientele, and he became very famous thanks to them. Some of the most famous include those of Painter Simington, Mihajlo Pupin, Đorđe Jovanović, King Alexander I of Yugoslavia and others. He painted the portraits of his longtime model and wife, Muni with special care.

Painting women for Paja Jovanović always meant painting beauty. He simply did not want to see them ugly and old. Even when it was about not so beautiful women, he always tried to find the beauty in them. Many art critics reproached him for this, and sent fierce and even caustic criticisms, but he remained true to himself and his wisdom in life: "Skill is to find beauty."

Jovanović focused mostly on Serbian history, painting various historical events, such as 

 The Proclamation of Dušan's Law Codex, codex made by first Serbian Emperor
 Saint Sava reconciling his quarrelling brothers, Sava was monk and a saint who focused on Serbian education and religion
 Migration of the Serbs, Depicting Serbs led by Archbishop Arsenije III, fleeing Old Serbia and moving up north to Austria, Hungary and Vojvodina
 The Wedding of Emperor Stefan Dušan

He painted the iconostasis in the church of St Nicholas in Dolovo and Orthodox cathedral in Novi Sad, which was painted without commission. He spent most of his time in his atelier in Vienna, where he settled, and occasionally travelled to Belgrade. In 1940 he was made honorary citizen of Vršac, and in 1949 he was given the Order zasluga za narod (Merit for People) of the first category. He lived quietly and lonely, after his wife's early death, in Vienna until his own death in 1957. According to his will, the urn with his ashes was to be moved to Belgrade and where "The Legacy of Paja Jovanović" was opened in 1970, as well in Vršac. Later, in the building of the Old Pharmacy on the Stairs, in 1977 the permanent commemorative exhibition of Paja Jovanović was opened. The works of Paja Jovanović have been kept in the Town Museum of Vršac, along with his well-known painting Vršac triptych. Most of his works and personal belongings can be found in the Belgrade City Museum.

Benefactor
Paja Jovanović was also a member of "Privrednik" Patronage. He remembered after graduating from the Academy of Fine Arts in Vienna, that it was the Matica Srpska that afforded him schooling. He joined Privrednik's work early on, making annual monetary donations and furthermore donating his valuable works of art to the Society.

Legacy
He is included in The 100 most prominent Serbs list. 
Along with Uroš Predić and Đorđe Krstić, he is considered the most important Serbian painter of realism. Thanks to his extremely rich oeuvre with over 1100 works, especially works with themes from folk life and history, he strongly and widely influenced art education, culture, but also the patriotism of Serbian people. Jovanović received a number of orders and decorations both in Serbia and abroad. A number of schools in Serbia are named after him.

Selected works

See also
 List of Orientalist artists
 Orientalism

Further reading

A Survey of Serbian art by Ljubica D. Popovich

References

External links

Museum of Paja Jovanovic, Belgrade City Museum.
The Legacy of Paja Jovanović, Belgrade City Museum.
In Remembrance of Paja Jovanović, Town Museum of Vrsac.
 Decorating of the Bride (1885) by Paja Jovanovic, National Museum Belgrade.
Rooster Fight (1897) by Paja Jovanovic, National Museum Belgrade.
Greek Soldiers with a Woman Traitor by Paja Jovanovic, BBC arts.
Greek Ballad by Paja Jovanovic

 
1859 births
1957 deaths
People from Vršac
Serbs of Vojvodina
Realist painters
Serbian painters
Eastern Orthodox Christians from Serbia
Serbian people of French descent
Academy of Fine Arts Vienna alumni
19th-century Serbian people
20th-century Serbian people
Members of the Serbian Academy of Sciences and Arts
Burials at Belgrade New Cemetery
Orientalist painters